In mathematics, the conjugate gradient method is an algorithm for the numerical solution of particular systems of linear equations, namely those whose matrix is positive-definite. The conjugate gradient method is often implemented as an iterative algorithm, applicable to sparse systems that are too large to be handled by a direct implementation or other direct methods such as the Cholesky decomposition. Large sparse systems often arise when numerically solving partial differential equations or optimization problems.

The conjugate gradient method can also be used to solve unconstrained optimization problems such as energy minimization. It is commonly attributed to Magnus Hestenes and Eduard Stiefel, who programmed it on the Z4, and extensively researched it.

The biconjugate gradient method provides a generalization to non-symmetric matrices. Various nonlinear conjugate gradient methods seek minima of nonlinear optimization problems.

Description of the problem addressed by conjugate gradients

Suppose we want to solve the system of linear equations

Derivation as a direct method

The conjugate gradient method can be derived from several different perspectives, including specialization of the conjugate direction method for optimization, and variation of the Arnoldi/Lanczos iteration for eigenvalue problems. Despite differences in their approaches, these derivations share a common topic—proving the orthogonality of the residuals and conjugacy of the search directions. These two properties are crucial to developing the well-known succinct formulation of the method.

We say that two non-zero vectors u and v are conjugate (with respect to ) if

Since  is symmetric and positive-definite, the left-hand side defines an inner product

Two vectors are conjugate if and only if they are orthogonal with respect to this inner product. Suppose that

Left-multiplying the problem  with the vector  yields

and so

This gives the following method for solving the equation : find a sequence of  conjugate directions, and then compute the coefficients .

As an iterative method

If we choose the conjugate vectors  carefully, then we may not need all of them to obtain a good approximation to the solution . So, we want to regard the conjugate gradient method as an iterative method. This also allows us to approximately solve systems where n is so large that the direct method would take too much time.
 
Starting with x0 we search for the solution and in each iteration we need a metric to tell us whether we are closer to the solution  (that is unknown to us). This metric comes from the fact that the solution  is also the unique minimizer of the following quadratic function

The existence of a unique minimizer is apparent as its Hessian matrix of second derivatives is symmetric positive-definite

and that the minimizer (use Df(x)=0) solves the initial problem follows from its first derivative

This suggests taking the first basis vector p0 to be the negative of the gradient of f at x = x0. The gradient of f equals . Starting with an initial guess x0, this means we take p0 = b − Ax0. The other vectors in the basis will be conjugate to the gradient, hence the name conjugate gradient method.  Note that p0 is also the residual provided by this initial step of the algorithm.

Let rk be the residual at the kth step:

Here, however, we insist that the directions  must be conjugate to each other. A practical way to enforce this is by requiring that the next search direction be built out of the current residual and all previous search directions. The conjugation constraint is an orthonormal-type constraint and hence the algorithm can be viewed as an example of Gram-Schmidt orthonormalization. This gives the following expression:

(see the picture at the top of the article for the effect of the conjugacy constraint on convergence). Following this direction, the next optimal location is given by

with 

The expression for  can be derived if one substitutes the expression for xk+1 into f and minimizing it with respect to

The resulting algorithm
The above algorithm gives the most straightforward explanation of the conjugate gradient method. Seemingly, the algorithm as stated requires storage of all previous searching directions and residue vectors, as well as many matrix–vector multiplications, and thus can be computationally expensive. , for i ≠ j. This can be regarded that as the algorithm progresses,  and  span the same Krylov subspace.

The algorithm is detailed below for solving Ax = b where  is a real, symmetric, positive-definite matrix. The input vector  can be an approximate initial solution or 0. It is a different formulation of the exact procedure described above.

This is the most commonly used algorithm.

Restarts
Restarts could slow down convergence, but may improve stability if the conjugate gradient method misbehaves, e.g., due to round-off error.

Explicit residual calculation
The former is used in the algorithm to avoid an extra multiplication by  since the vector  is already computed to evaluate . The latter may be more accurate, substituting the explicit calculation  for the implicit one by the recursion subject to round-off error accumulation, and is thus recommended for an occasional evaluation.

A norm of the residual is typically used for stopping criteria. The norm of the explicit residual  provides a guaranteed level of accuracy both in exact arithmetic and in the presence of the rounding errors, where convergence naturally stagnates. In contrast, the implicit residual  is known to keep getting smaller in amplitude well below the level of rounding errors and thus cannot be used to determine the stagnation of convergence.

Computation of alpha and beta
The denominator is simplified from

since . Initially,  is

using

and equivalently

The denominator is rewritten as
 

using that the search directions pk are conjugated and again that the residuals are orthogonal.

Example code in MATLAB / GNU Octave
function x = conjgrad(A, b, x)
    r = b - A * x;
    p = r;
    rsold = r' * r;

    for i = 1:length(b)
        Ap = A * p;
        alpha = rsold / (p' * Ap);
        x = x + alpha * p;
        r = r - alpha * Ap;
        rsnew = r' * r;
        if sqrt(rsnew) < 1e-10
            break
        end
        p = r + (rsnew / rsold) * p;
        rsold = rsnew;
    end
end

Numerical example

Consider the linear system Ax = b given by

we will perform two steps of the conjugate gradient method beginning with the initial guess

in order to find an approximate solution to the system.

Solution
For reference, the exact solution is 

Our first step is to calculate the residual vector r0 associated with x0.  This residual is computed from the formula r0 = b - Ax0, and in our case is equal to

Since this is the first iteration, we will use the residual vector r0 as our initial search direction p0; the method of selecting pk will change in further iterations.

We now compute the scalar  using the relationship

We can now compute x1 using the formula

This result completes the first iteration, the result being an "improved" approximate solution to the system, x1. We may now move on and compute the next residual vector r1 using the formula

Our next step in the process is to compute the scalar  that will eventually be used to determine the next search direction p1.

Now, using this scalar , we can compute the next search direction p1 using the relationship

Finally, we find x2 using the same method as that used to find x1.

The result, x2, is a "better" approximation to the system's solution than x1 and x0.  If exact arithmetic were to be used in this example instead of limited-precision, then the exact solution would theoretically have been reached after n = 2 iterations (n being the order of the system).

Convergence properties
The conjugate gradient method can theoretically be viewed as a direct method, as in the absence of round-off error it produces the exact solution after a finite number of iterations, which is not larger than the size of the matrix. In practice, the exact solution is never obtained since the conjugate gradient method is unstable with respect to even small perturbations, e.g., most directions are not in practice conjugate, due to a degenerative nature of generating the Krylov subspaces.

As an iterative method, the conjugate gradient method monotonically (in the energy norm) improves approximations  to the exact solution and may reach the required tolerance after a relatively small (compared to the problem size) number of iterations. The improvement is typically linear and its speed is determined by the condition number  of the system matrix : the larger  is, the slower the improvement.

Convergence theorem 

Define a subset of polynomials as

where  is the set of polynomials of maximal degree .

Now, the rate of convergence can be approximated as 

where  denotes the spectrum, and  denotes the condition number.

Note, the important limit when  tends to 

No round-off error is assumed in the convergence theorem, but the convergence bound is commonly valid in practice as theoretically explained by Anne Greenbaum.

Practical convergence 

If initialized randomly, the first stage of iterations is often the fastest, as the error is eliminated within the Krylov subspace that initially reflects a smaller effective condition number. In the last stage, the smallest attainable accuracy is reached and the convergence stalls or the method may even start diverging. In typical scientific computing applications in double-precision floating-point format for matrices of large sizes, the conjugate gradient method uses a stopping criteria with a tolerance that terminates the iterations during the first or second stage.

The preconditioned conjugate gradient method

In most cases, preconditioning is necessary to ensure fast convergence of the conjugate gradient method. It takes the following form:

repeat

if rk+1 is sufficiently small then exit loop end if

end repeat
The result is xk+1

The above formulation is equivalent to applying the regular conjugate gradient method to the preconditioned system

where 

The Cholesky decomposition of the preconditioner must be used to keep the symmetry (and positive definiteness) of the system. However, this decomposition does not need to be computed, and it is sufficient to know .

The preconditioner matrix M has to be symmetric positive-definite and fixed, i.e., cannot change from iteration to iteration. 
If any of these assumptions on the preconditioner is violated, the behavior of the preconditioned conjugate gradient method may become unpredictable.

An example of a commonly used preconditioner is the incomplete Cholesky factorization.

The flexible preconditioned conjugate gradient method

In numerically challenging applications, sophisticated preconditioners are used, which may lead to variable preconditioning, changing between iterations. Even if the preconditioner is symmetric positive-definite on every iteration, the fact that it may change makes the arguments above invalid, and in practical tests leads to a significant slow down of the convergence of the algorithm presented above. Using the Polak–Ribière formula

instead of the Fletcher–Reeves formula

may dramatically improve the convergence in this case. This version of the preconditioned conjugate gradient method can be called flexible, as it allows for variable preconditioning. 
The flexible version is also shown to be robust even if the preconditioner is not symmetric positive definite (SPD).

The implementation of the flexible version requires storing an extra vector.

The mathematical explanation of the better convergence behavior of the method with the Polak–Ribière formula is that the method is locally optimal in this case, in particular, it does not converge slower than the locally optimal steepest descent method.

Vs. the locally optimal steepest descent method

In both the original and the preconditioned conjugate gradient methods one only needs to set   in order to make them locally optimal, using the line search, steepest descent methods. With this substitution, vectors  are always the same as vectors , so there is no need to store vectors . Thus, every iteration of these steepest descent methods is a bit cheaper compared to that for the conjugate gradient methods. However, the latter converge faster, unless a (highly) variable and/or non-SPD preconditioner is used, see above.

Conjugate gradient method as optimal feedback controller for double integrator

The conjugate gradient method can also be derived using optimal control theory.

Conjugate gradient on the normal equations

The conjugate gradient method can be applied to an arbitrary n-by-m matrix by applying it to normal equations ATA and right-hand side vector ATb, since  ATA is a symmetric positive-semidefinite matrix for any A. The result is conjugate gradient on the normal equations (CGNR).

 ATAx =  ATb

As an iterative method, it is not necessary to form  ATA explicitly in memory but only to perform the matrix–vector and transpose matrix–vector multiplications. Therefore, CGNR is particularly useful when A is a sparse matrix since these operations are usually extremely efficient. However the downside of forming the normal equations is that the condition number κ(ATA) is equal to κ2(A) and so the rate of convergence of CGNR may be slow and the quality of the approximate solution may be sensitive to roundoff errors. Finding a good preconditioner is often an important part of using the CGNR method.

Several algorithms have been proposed (e.g., CGLS, LSQR). The   LSQR algorithm purportedly has the best numerical stability when A is ill-conditioned, i.e., A has a large condition number.

Conjugate gradient method for complex Hermitian matrices

The conjugate gradient method with a trivial modification is extendable to solving, given complex-valued matrix A and vector b, the system of linear equations  for the complex-valued vector x, where A is Hermitian (i.e., A' = A) and positive-definite matrix, and the symbol ' denotes the conjugate transpose using the MATLAB/GNU Octave style. The trivial modification is simply substituting the conjugate transpose for the real transpose everywhere. This substitution is backward compatible, since conjugate transpose turns into real transpose on real-valued vectors and matrices. The provided above Example code in MATLAB/GNU Octave thus already works for complex Hermitian matrices needed no modification.

See also

 Biconjugate gradient method (BiCG)
 Conjugate residual method
 Gaussian belief propagation
 Iterative method: Linear systems
 Krylov subspace
 Nonlinear conjugate gradient method
 Preconditioning
 Sparse matrix–vector multiplication

References

Further reading
 
 
 
 
 Gérard Meurant: "Detection and correction of silent errors in the conjugate gradient algorithm", Numerical Algorithms, vol.92 (2023), pp.869-891. url=https://doi.org/10.1007/s11075-022-01380-1

External links
 

Numerical linear algebra
Gradient methods
Articles with example MATLAB/Octave code